The following is a chronological list of television series and individual programmes where Sir David Attenborough is credited as writer, presenter, narrator or producer. In a career spanning eight decades, Attenborough's name has become synonymous with the natural history programmes produced by the BBC Natural History Unit.

Major projects

1950s

1960s

1970s

1980s

1990s

2000s

2010s

2020s

Other programmes 
In addition to writing, presenting, narrating and producing his own documentaries, Sir David Attenborough has made regular appearances as an on-screen and off-screen participant in other film-makers' documentaries and on other numerous television programmes. The following list includes some of his more notable appearances plus long-running shows:

1950s

1960s

1970s

1980s

1990s

2000s

2010s

2020s

Sources 
 David Attenborough, Life on Air, BBC Books, 2002
 David Attenborough filmography at the BFI Film and TV Database
 David Attenborough filmography at IMDb.com

References

External links 
 
 List of David Attenborough's programmes on Eden Channel website

Male actor filmographies
British filmographies
Documentary films about nature
David Attenborough